Las Valeras is a municipality located in the province of Cuenca, Castile-La Mancha, Spain. According to the 2004 census (INE), the municipality had a population of 1,399 inhabitants.

References 

Municipalities in the Province of Cuenca